The following is a list of most expensive association football transfers, which details the highest transfer fees ever paid for players, as well as transfers which set new world transfer records. The first recorded record transfer was of Willie Groves from West Bromwich Albion to Aston Villa for £100 in 1893. This occurred just eight years after the introduction of professionalism by the Football Association in 1885. The current transfer record was set by the transfer of Neymar from Barcelona to Paris Saint-Germain for €222 million (£190 million) in August 2017.

Highest transfer payments in association football
Most of the transfers on this list are to clubs under UEFA's jurisdiction and most of the purchasing clubs are from England, France, Italy and Spain.

Romelu Lukaku appears on this list three times for moves to Manchester United, Internazionale and Chelsea. Two players appear on the list twice: Cristiano Ronaldo and Matthijs de Ligt. All of the players on the list are of European (UEFA), South American (CONMEBOL) and African (CAF) origin. There are currently no players on the list from the remaining regions; North America (CONCACAF), Asia (AFC) and Oceania (OFC).

World football transfer record
The first player to ever be transferred for a fee of over £100 was Scottish striker Willie Groves when he together with Jack Reynolds (£50) made the switch from West Bromwich Albion to Aston Villa in 1893, eight years after the legalisation of professionalism in the sport. It took just another twelve years for the figure to become £1000, when Sunderland striker Alf Common moved to Middlesbrough. It was not until 1928 that the first five-figure transfer took place. David Jack of Bolton Wanderers was the subject of interest from Arsenal, and in order to negotiate the fee down, Arsenal manager Herbert Chapman got the Bolton representatives drunk. Subsequently, David Jack was transferred for a world record fee when Arsenal paid £10,890 to Bolton for his services, after Bolton had asked for £13,000, which was double the previous record made when Sunderland signed Burnley's Bob Kelly a fee of for £6,500.

The first player from outside Great Britain to break the record was Bernabé Ferreyra, a player known as La Fiera for his powerful shot. His 1932 transfer from Tigre to River Plate cost £23k, and the record would last for 17 years (the longest the record has lasted) until it was broken by Manchester United's sale of Johnny Morris to Derby County for £24k in March 1949. The record was broken seven further times between 1949 and 1961, when Luis Suárez Miramontes was sold by Barcelona to Inter Milan for £152k, becoming the first ever player sold for more than £100k. In 1968, Pietro Anastasi became the first £500k player when Juventus purchased him from Varese, which was followed seven years later with Giuseppe Savoldi becoming the first million pound player when he transferred from Bologna to Napoli.

After Alf Common and David Jack, the third player to twice be transferred for world record fees is Diego Maradona. His transfers from Boca Juniors to Barcelona for £3m, and then to Napoli for £5m, both broke the record in 1982 and 1984 respectively. In the space of 61 days in 1992, three transfers broke the record, all by Italian clubs: Jean-Pierre Papin transferred from Marseille to A.C. Milan, becoming the first ever £10m player. Almost immediately, rivals Juventus topped that with the signing of Gianluca Vialli for a fee of £12m from Sampdoria. Milan then completed the signing of Gianluigi Lentini for a fee of £13m which stood as the record for three years.

The 1996 transfer of Alan Shearer from Blackburn Rovers to Newcastle United, for a fee of £15m, kickstarted a year-by-year succession of record breaking transfers: Ronaldo moved the following year to Inter Milan from Barcelona for a fee of £17m, which was followed in 1998 by the shock transfer of his fellow countryman Denílson from São Paulo to Real Betis for a fee of approximately £21m. In 1999 and 2000, Italian clubs returned to their record-breaking ways, with Christian Vieri transferring from Lazio to Inter Milan for £28m, while Hernán Crespo's transfer from Parma to Lazio ensured he became the first player to cost more than £30m. The transfer prompted the BBC to ask "has the world gone mad"? It took two weeks for the record to be broken when Luís Figo made a controversial £37m move from Barcelona to rivals Real Madrid. A year later, Real increased the record again with a signing of Zinedine Zidane for £48 million (150 billion lire).

Zidane's record stood for 8 years, the longest since the 1940s. Real Madrid continued with the Galácticos policy by buying Kaká from Milan for €67 million (£56 million), which was the world record in pound sterling. However, both world record in euro and in pound sterling were broken by Real themselves when signing Cristiano Ronaldo for £80m (€94m) from Manchester United in the same transfer window, Four years later Real Madrid broke the record again after completed the signing of Gareth Bale from Tottenham Hotspur in 2013. Although Real initially insisted that the transfer cost €91.59 million, slightly less than the Ronaldo fee, the deal was widely reported to be around €100 million (around £85.1 million). Documents leaked in 2016 by Football Leaks revealed that instalments brought the final Bale fee up to a total of €100,759,418. In 2016, Manchester United eventually took the record away from Real Madrid, signing French midfielder Paul Pogba for €105 million (£89 million), four years after having released him to Juventus for training compensation.

A year after the Pogba transfer, however, there was a major jump in the record fee. Paris Saint-Germain matched the €222 million buyout fee of Barcelona's Neymar, converted to a reported £198 million by different sources, or £200 million more than double the previous record. This was the first time that the record fee was paid by a French club.

Historical progression

Number of record players by country

Cumulative transfers

Managers

While players are often purchased for high fees, the fee to release a manager from their contract is a lot less. Usually described as a "compensation fee", the amount paid to the manager's current club is based around several factors including the total salary for the current length of his contract, as well as potential bonuses and sponsorship deals, and additional fees if the club also need to pay compensation to hire a new manager.

For football managers, the list is as follows:

Women

Two players appear on the list twice: Sofie Svava and Crystal Dunn, the latter for two separate moves in one day. The players on the list include at least one from each of the continental regions: Europe (UEFA), North America (CONCACAF), South America (CONMEBOL), Africa (CAF), Asia (AFC) and Oceania (OFC). However, most are European or North American; the purchasing clubs are all European, North American, or Asian. While more of the players on the list play as forwards than in any other position, most of the top ten (including all of those who achieved world record fees) are midfielders.

This list only includes transfers where a fee amount is reported publicly. Fees are in thousands.

Pairs
Occasionally, two players can be traded in one deal.

 Domestic moves in the American National Women's Soccer League (NWSL) are trades rather than transfers; where cash is involved, it comes from allocation money, a fixed but exchangeable asset of $400,000 per team that can be used to supplement player wages above the league salary cap, pay transfer fees to foreign clubs, or fund other player-focused improvements in order to attract talent and create competition.

Record progression
The first transfer of a female footballer was of Molly Walker, from Lancaster Ladies to Dick, Kerr Ladies in 1918; Walker was offered expenses paid as well as payment in lieu for joining the team. The first transfer fee for a women's footballer known to be reported as a world record was the £200,000 ($310,000; €235,000) paid for Milene Domingues in 2002. At the time, there was little to no money in women's football and financial news focused on player salaries; Domingues received greater attention for the reported record salary she was to receive, though she ended up never playing for Rayo Vallecano, the club that signed her, due to non-Spanish players being unable to play in the Spanish women's league at the time. However, Domingues was not a particularly skilled player, instead being a popular figure as the personable wife of Ronaldo, and her record signing was made more for promotional reasons. She fulfilled promotional duties at Rayo while returning to play for her previous team, Fiammamonza, without salary.

This transfer sum was not overtaken until September 2020, when Pernille Harder was bought by Chelsea for £250,000 ($334,000; €280,000). When, almost a year prior to Harder's transfer, Sam Kerr had also moved to Chelsea, focus was still on her large salary. In beating the near 20-year record by her transfer, Harder said she hoped it would help start to show that women's football can also be a club business like men's football and receive more money.

The American NWSL introduced allocation money (capped at $400,000) beginning with the 2020 season, allowing cash as an asset to be involved in player trades. A significant number of players in this league then began being traded for cash assets, though none to overtake the record, after Harder's signing. For the 2020 season, Spain introduced the "Compensation List", part of a wider agreement between women's football clubs as a step towards professionalism; the Compensation List ruled that players under the age of 23 could only transfer between Spanish clubs for a fee, even when their contract is expired. The club they were to leave would set an asking price, and if no other club was willing to pay (and the player did not move to a club outside of Spain), the original club had to re-sign the player with a salary increase matching a percentage of the asking price. There were criticisms of the Compensation List, as few clubs wanted to pay and it was seen to encourage young talents to leave the country.

Harder gave similar comments about transfers promoting market growth in women's football when her record was beaten two years later by Barcelona buying Keira Walsh from Manchester City for £400,000 ($457,000; €470,000) in September 2022. Walsh instead was coy, saying she did not think about the record much, that she wanted to play at the club and "it just so happens that's what they paid for [her]." The Athletic and BBC Sport wrote that Walsh's transfer "shifted the ecosystem", having a significant impact on the market of women's football, that it showed "even the top clubs are not immune to the risk of losing their best players to rivals who are now willing to spend". It marked exponential growth for the transfer market; spending in transfer windows had been growing, with the winter 2021–22 window setting a then-record for global transfers in one season at a total of around £364,000 ($488,000; €432,000). Walsh's fee alone in the summer 2022 window eclipsed this, with further high transfer fees being paid as a domino effect supplementing the season total.

Gallery

See also
Professionalism in association football
List of world association football records
List of most expensive American soccer transfers

Notes

References

 
Transfers
Expense
Transfers
Transfers
Association football transfers